The Frasin is a left tributary of the river Jijia in Romania. It flows into the Jijia near Cârniceni.

References

Rivers of Romania
Rivers of Iași County